Håkan Bengtsson (born 13 April 1942) is a Swedish former swimmer. He competed in the men's 200 metre butterfly at the 1960 Summer Olympics.

References

External links
 

1942 births
Living people
Swedish male butterfly swimmers
Olympic swimmers of Sweden
Swimmers at the 1960 Summer Olympics
People from Karlskrona
Sportspeople from Blekinge County